Linha de Passe is a 2008 Brazilian drama film directed by Walter Salles and Daniela Thomas. Written by Salles, Thomas and Bráulio Mantovani, the film stars Vinícius de Oliveira and Sandra Corveloni, who won the Best Actress Award at the 2008 Cannes Film Festival for her role, which was her first in a full-length motion picture.

Plot
The film tells the story of four poverty-stricken half brothers with the same mother, Cleuza (Sandra Corveloni) but different fathers, who live in a suburban neighborhood in the periphery of São Paulo and have to fight to follow their dreams. Dario (Vinícius de Oliveira), seeks the opportunity of a better life with his soccer skills; Dênis (João Baldasserin) survives as a motorcycle courier; Dinho (José Geraldo Rodrigues) works in a filling station and helps at the local church and Reginaldo (Kaique Jesus Santos), although gifted as a soccer player dreams of becoming a bus driver. Cleuza, pregnant with her fifth child, works as a cleaner for a woman in a middle class area of São Paulo.

Cast
Sandra Corveloni as Cleuza
João Baldasserini as Dênis
Vinícius de Oliveira as Dario
José Geraldo Rodrigues as Dinho
Kaique Jesus Santos as Reginaldo

Awards and nominations
2008 Cannes Film Festival
Palme d'Or – Walter Salles and Daniela Thomas (nominated)
Best Actress Award – Sandra Corveloni (won)

References

External links
 Official Trailer with English subtitles
 Video interview with Walter Salles opening Cambridge Film Festival 2008 with "Linha de Passe" ITV Anglia
 

2008 films
2008 drama films
Brazilian drama films
2000s Portuguese-language films
Films set in São Paulo
Films shot in São Paulo
Films directed by Walter Salles
Films directed by Daniela Thomas
Best Picture APCA Award winners